0806 is the debut single album by South Korean idol group D-Crunch. It was released on August 6, 2018, by All-S Company and distributed by Kakao M. The group contributed to the lyrics, composition, and choreography of its songs. The lead single "Palace" is a "powerful" hip hop track.

0806 and "Palace" were concurrently released. D-Crunch held a showcase for the album and the group began promoting the song by performing on music chart programs across various television networks. The single album peaked at number 46 on South Korea's national Gaon Album Chart, where it has shifted over 1,000 copies since its release.

Background and music structure
Created by Lee Jong-seok under All-S Company, D-Crunch was formally announced as a nine-member hip hop group on July 4, 2018. D-Crunch contributed to the lyrics, composition, and rapping on its tracks, and were also involved in crafting the songs' choreography. Songwriting team G.I.G, which compromises members O.V, Hyunwook, and Hyunoh, took part in writing lyrics and composition. To differentiate D-Crunch from other idol groups, O.V decided to debut with a "fierce" hip hop track to leave an impression on the general public. Recording for 0806 took place at All-S Studio; it was mixed and mastered at FoaL Sound.

"Palace" is a "cinematic" hip hop song which utilizes "heavy" sub-bass and a trap beat layered over an orchestra section. O.V stated that the track illustrates "dark and mischievous" hip hop. The lyrics deal with "breaking out of fear and thrill to take the first step into the world". The track "overflows with power" and "intense rapping" is employed. For its visual concept, D-Crunch sported all-black waterproof tech wear. In contrast to the single, the second track "I Want" showcases a "refreshing and cute charm". It was described as the "heart-changing song of busy contemporary men". D-Crunch included musically different songs to demonstrate its versatility. The single album's titled 0806 refers the group's debut date.

Release and promotion

Three weeks preceding D-Crunch's debut, a silhouette of the nonet against a red background was published. Beginning on July 23, profile images of each group member were released for three consecutive days in batches of three: Hyunwook, Hyunho, and Hyunwoo; Hyunoh, O.V, and Minhyuk; and Chanyoung, Dylan, Jungseung. An audio teaser of the lead single "Palace" was unveiled on July 26. Four days later, a teaser photo of D-Crunch was released. On August 1, a performance highlight video of "Palace", choreographed by the group, was shared. Directed by Lee Gi-baek, the single's music video teaser followed on the subsequent day.

0806 and the music video for "Palace" was simultaneously released on August 6. The group held a showcase for 0806 at the Shinsegae Mesa Hall in the Jung District of Seoul. D-Crunch began promoting "Palace" the following day by performing it on SBS MTV's music chart show The Show. The group made follow-up performances on Mnet's M Countdown, Seoul Broadcasting System's (SBS) Inkigayo, MBC Music's Show Champion, and KBS2's Music Bank. A choreography video of "I Want" was released on August 20. D-Crunch also promoted the single by busking in Hongdae in September. Promotions for the record were completed after six weeks.

Critical reception
The Korean Broadcasting System banned the track "I Want" from syndication on its network after deeming it "unfit for broadcast". The company determined that the lyrics violated article 46 of broadcasting review regulations for mentioning a "specific" product brand.

Commercial performance
On the chart dated August 5 – 11, 2018, 0806 debuted at number 46 on South Korea's national Gaon Album Chart. By the end of the month, it shifted 1,105 units domestically.

Track listing

Credits
Credits adapted from the single album's liner notes.

 Bae So-woon – fan marketing
 Carry Diamond – rap director
 Chanyoung – choreographer
 Eun-tim – stylist
 Eun-jeong – make-up artist
 G.I.G – composer, lyricist, music director
 Ga-in – stylist
 Gyu-cheol – choreographer
 Hwang Yong-shik – photographer
 Hyeon-jeong – hair designer
 Hyeong-seop – choreographer
 Hyunoh – choreographer
 Jang Gi-hyeon – photographer
 Jang Se-hwan – manufacture

 Kim Han-sol – fan marketing
 Kim Yu-jeong – jacket design
 Lee Jong-seok – executive producer
 Na Sang-cheon – marketing director
 Nam Ho-cheol – A&R
 O.V – choreographer
 Park Sang-mu – photographer
 Park Shil-jang – stylist
 Renziee – arranger, composer, lyricist, music director, music producer
 Seo Hye-mi – media marketing
 Seung-rae – choreographer
 Shin Jeong-woo – artist management
 Shin Seong-shik – artist management
 Yoon Heung-kwan – management director

Chart

References

2018 debut albums
D-Crunch albums
Kakao M albums
Single albums